Shanibarer Chithi (meaning the Saturday Letter in English) was a monthly Bengali literary magazine published by Shaniranjan Press in Kolkata, India. It was founded in 1929 by Ashok Chattopadhyay as the conservative response to the progressive literary magazine Kallol which was founded a year ago. It started as a weekly. Later it became a monthly. The magazine was one of the major satirical publications in India. Sajanikanta Das joined the magazine from eleventh issue as the editor who made the magazine popular.

Editors 
 Jogananda Das
 Nirad Chandra Chaudhuri
 Sajanikanta Das
 Parimal Goswami

References

Bengali-language magazines
Conservative magazines
Defunct literary magazines
Defunct magazines published in India
Literary magazines published in India
Monthly magazines published in India
Weekly magazines published in India
Magazines established in 1929
Mass media in Kolkata
Magazines with year of disestablishment missing
Satirical magazines